The Saint Helena hoopoe (Upupa antaios), also known as the Saint Helena giant hoopoe or giant hoopoe, is an extinct species of the hoopoe (family Upupidae), known exclusively from an incomplete subfossil skeleton. It was last seen around 1550.

Description 
It was endemic to the island of Saint Helena in the South Atlantic. Upupa antaios was a large bird, having bigger and more robust skull and wing elements than those of the common hoopoe (Upupa epops). Its beak is also more massive and decurved in comparison with common hoopoe, which could be the ancestor of U. antaios. It was most likely flightless.

History of study 
The first analysis of this species was given in 1963 by the British zoologist Philip Ashmole, who discovered, in the Dry Gut sediments east of Saint Helena, a left humerus which differed significantly from that of other Upupidae.

The incomplete skeleton, which was found in 1975 by the palaeontologist Storrs L. Olson, consists of both coracoids and the left femur.

Ecology 
Saint Helena giant hoopoe could have been a predator of the extinct Saint Helena earwig (Labidura herculeana).

References

†
Extinct flightless birds
Extinct birds of Atlantic islands
Bird extinctions since 1500
Saint Helena hoopoe
Saint Helena hoopoe